The GIAT 30 is a series of 30 mm cannon developed to replace the DEFA 550 series weapons on French military aircraft.

Introduced in the late 1980s, the GIAT 30 is a revolver cannon with electric ignition and automatic recocking. Unlike the DEFA cannon, the revolver chamber is electrically operated, rather than gas operated, improving both reliability and rate of fire.

Two versions of the GIAT 30 are offered.

GIAT 30M 781

Primarily intended for helicopter use and offered in several fixed, podded, and turreted installations. It is designed to fire the ADEN/DEFA 30x113mm B rounds.

Given its considerable recoil, it is typically used for single shots or controlled bursts rather than continuous fire. The 30 M781 is used on the Eurocopter Tiger and is also offered for naval use as part of the NARWHAL (NAval Remote Weapon High Accuracy and Light) system.

Ammunition: HEI; SAPHEI; APHEI-SD; API-T; TP.

GIAT 30M 791

Intended for fighter aircraft such as the Dassault Rafale. It uses a new range of 30x150mm B ammunition in a variety of types. A selectable rate of fire allows cyclic rates of 300, 600, 1500, or 2500 rounds per minute. It can fire continuous bursts or controlled 0.5 or 1 second bursts.

Military operators 
 : Rafale and Tiger
 : Rafale
 : Rafale
 : Rafale
 : Rafale
 : Tiger
 : Tiger
 : Rafale

References

External links
NEXTER Group - THL 30

30 mm artillery
Aircraft guns
Autocannon
Nexter Systems
Military equipment introduced in the 1980s